Mladost 3 Metro Station is a station on the Sofia Metro in Bulgaria. It opened on 25 April 2012. Bulgaria's PM Boyko Borisov and EU Council President Herman Van Rompuy inaugurated the new section of the Sofia Metro, which was funded with EU money.

Interchange with other public transport
None at the moment. Tramway service on line 23 is expected to open in the future. City Bus service on line 510 is expected to open in the future.

Location

Gallery

References

External links

 Sofia Metropolitan
 SofiaMetro@UrbanRail
 Sofia Urban Mobility Center
 Sofia Metro station projects
 Sofia Metropolitan
 Project Slide

Sofia Metro stations
Railway stations opened in 2012
2012 establishments in Bulgaria